The Beacon of Hope or Thanksgiving Square Beacon is a £300,000 public art metal sculpture by Andy Scott 19.5 metres high  constructed in 2007 in Thanksgiving Square in Belfast, Northern Ireland. Other nicknames for the piece include Nuala with the Hula (credited to Gerard Doyle), the Belle on the Ball, the Thing with the Ring, Our Lady of Thanksgiving and the Angel of Thanksgiving. It is currently the second largest public art sculpture in Belfast, after Rise on Broadway Roundabout.

Construction 
The sculpture is the result of six years of planning, development and eventual fabrication. Made of stainless steel and cast bronze, she spirals upwards and holds aloft "the ring of thanksgiving". The globe at her feet indicates the universal philosophy of peace, harmony and thanksgiving, and has marked on its surface the cities where the people and industries of Belfast migrated and exported to.

The sculpture was fabricated by local company P.F. Copeland Ltd of 9 Mallusk Drive, Newtownabbey, BT36 4GX who retain the rights to the image, worked from the original scale maquettes by Scott, with the bronze globe cast by Beltane Studios in Peebles.

As an icon for Belfast it has been adopted by Belfast City Council, tourism authorities, TV companies and several businesses as an emblem and logo; and in early October 2006 was recognised as the best artwork in the city by the Belfast Chamber of Trade and Commerce.

Concept 
The artwork is based on a concept proposed by Myrtle Smyth, who was inspired by Thanks-Giving Square in Dallas in Texas.

Lord Diljit Rana, Baron Rana, chairman of the Thanksgiving Square charity, said the aim of the project was to create some public space for giving thanks.

Gallery

See also 
 Beacon of Hope (disambiguation)
List of public art in Belfast

References

External links 

Outdoor sculptures in Northern Ireland
Buildings and structures in Belfast
Tourist attractions in Belfast
Steel sculptures in Northern Ireland
2006 sculptures